The following is a list of county routes in Warren County in the U.S. state of New Jersey.

500-series county routes
In addition to those listed below, the following 500-series county routes serve Warren County:
CR 517, CR 519, CR 521, CR 579

Other county routes

See also

References

 
Warren